WGAT was a Southern Gospel-formatted broadcast radio station licensed to Gate City, Virginia, serving Gate City and Scott County, Virginia, and Kingsport, Tennessee.  WGAT was owned and operated by Tri-Cities Broadcasting Corporation. Its license was cancelled October 2, 2019.

History of call letters
The call letters WGAT were previously assigned to an AM station in Utica, New York.

References

External links
FCC Station Search Details: DWGAT (Facility ID: 67667)
FCC History Cards for WGAT (covering 1958-1981)

Defunct radio stations in the United States
1959 establishments in Virginia
Radio stations established in 1959
GAT
Radio stations disestablished in 2019
2019 disestablishments in Virginia
Defunct religious radio stations in the United States
GAT